Petrol is short for petroleum spirit, also known as gasoline.

Petrol may also refer to:

"Petrol" (song), by the Brit-pop band Ash (1994)
Petrol AD, an oil company of Bulgaria
Petrol Group or Petrol d.d., an oil company of Slovenia

See also
 Patrol (disambiguation)
 Petrel (disambiguation)